Bramah is a surname. Notable people with the surname include:

 Ernest Bramah (1868–1942), English author
 John Joseph Bramah (1798–1846), English ironmaster and engineer
 Joseph Bramah (1748–1814), English ironmaster and inventor, uncle of John Joseph Bramah
 Martin Bramah (born 1957), British musician